Premacha Game Same To Same is an Indian Marathi language television series aired on Star Pravah. It starred Sanchit Chaudhari, Sayali Jadhav and Prajakta Navnale in lead roles.

Cast 
 Sanchit Chaudhari as Raghu / Digha
 Sayali Jadhav
 Prajakta Navnale
 Kamal Thoke
 Mahesh Bhosale
 Daya Eksambekar
 Laxmi Vibhute
 Pallavi Patwardhan
 Umesh Bolake
 Siddheshwar Zadbuke
 Balkrishna Shinde

Adaptations

References

External links 
 
 Premacha Game Same To Same at Disney+ Hotstar
 
Marathi-language television shows
2020 Indian television series debuts
Star Pravah original programming
2020 Indian television series endings
Marathi-language television series based on Tamil-language television series